Elmo the Mighty is a 1919 American silent Western film serial directed by Henry MacRae and J. P. McGowan. The film is now considered to be lost.

Cast
 Elmo Lincoln as Captain Elmo Armstrong
 Grace Cunard as Lucille Gray
 Fred Starr
 Virginia Kraft
 Ivor McFadden
 James Cole
 Rex De Rosselli
 William Orlamond
 Bob Reeves
 Madge Hunt
 Grace McLean
 William N. Chapman (as W.H. Chapman)
 Chai Hong

See also
 List of American films of 1919
 List of film serials
 List of film serials by studio
 List of lost films

References

External links
 

1919 films
1919 Western (genre) films
1919 lost films
American silent serial films
American black-and-white films
Films directed by Henry MacRae
Lost Western (genre) films
Lost American films
Silent American Western (genre) films
1910s American films
1910s English-language films